The 2001 Appalachian State Mountaineers football team was an American football team that represented Appalachian State University as a member of the Southern Conference (SoCon) during the 2001 NCAA Division I-AA football season. In their 13th year under head coach Jerry Moore, the Mountaineers compiled an overall record of 9–4, with a conference mark of 6–2. Appalachian State advanced to the NCAA Division I-AA Football Championship playoffs, where they defeated William & Mary in the first round and lost to Georgia Southern in the quarterfinals.

Schedule

References

Appalachian State
Appalachian State Mountaineers football seasons
Appalachian State Mountaineers football